Rizal, officially the Municipality of Rizal,  is a 5th class municipality in the province of Laguna, Philippines. According to the 2020 census, it has a population of 18,332 people.

The municipality, named after the country's national hero José Rizal, is one of the youngest municipalities in Laguna.

This town is the birthplace of the milky mixed vegetable dish called "amenudong gulay".. The people from this town have an old tradition of celebrating Christmas on January 6. There was also a legend of Michael the Archangel apparitions at the town's biggest natural spring "Bukal ni San Miguel" during the Spanish era, making St. Michael the town's patron saint.

Rizal is the town where the World War II hero Brig. Gen. Marcos V. Agustin (a.k.a. Marcos Marking), Commander of the Marking's Guerillas is known to be buried and is also the hometown of Filipina actress-politician Angelica Jones.

History
The kaingineros were among the first reported settlers in this part of Laguna around the 17th century. Around mid-1800, this area was called barrio "Pauli" and was part of the town of Nagcarlan.

Residents from this place used to say that the barrio "Pauli" got its name from the way that its brook flows at the edge of the settlement, whose stream flows back and forth. “Pauli,” must have come from the Tagalog word “Pauli-uli,” which means coming back and forth.

Ever since, local villagers earn their living by farming. The soil in this barrio is rich and is abundant of water for there were numerous natural springs around the settlement, making the settlers enjoy bountiful harvests of coconuts, root crops, vegetables, and rice. Locales also thrive by fishing from the Mayton and Mayit brooks and Lawa ng Kalibato (Calibato Lake), which the village share with the town of Sampalok, which is now San Pablo City.

When the Spanish rule ended and the Philippines became a commonwealth state of the United States, Pauli became independent from the town of Nagcarlan and became a new township. The American Federal Government appointed Pedro Urrea the Municipal President. Nevertheless, Pauli's township lasted only for a brief two years. Its inability to support its administrative expenses caused Pauli to affiliate once more with its mother town.

However, between 1912 and 1915, residents led by Fortunato Urrea Arban, Agustin Vista, and Felix Isles, former municipal councilors campaigned to regain their municipal status. The petition included the inclusion of barrios Antipolo, Entablado, Laguan, Pook, Mayton, Pauli, Talaga and Tuy. On December 18, 1918, Governor-General Francis Burton Harrison issued Executive Order 56 creating the Municipality of Rizal, naming the town after the foremost national hero and Laguna native Dr. Jose P. Rizal.

Officials inaugurated the new town a year after on January 7, 1919, and had Fortunato Urrea Arban as mayor. Before the citizens of Pauli won back their township, Innocente Sumague donated a piece of land for the construction of a church (Parroquia De San Miguel Arcangel) in 1916. Construction workers quarried Mayton Creek for stones and gravel. The quarry claimed many lives before the construction ended, in time for the midnight mass of Christmas of 1917.

Pablo Urrea became the mayor in 1941 and subsequently relinquished his post to lead the guerrilla fighters during the Japanese occupation.

Geography

Located amidst coconut trees, Rizal is surrounded by the foothills of Mount San Cristobal, Mount Banahaw, and the Basilin Hill.

Barangays
Rizal is politically subdivided into 11 barangays.

 Antipolo
 Entablado
 Laguan
 Pauli 1
 Pauli 2
 East Poblacion
 West Poblacion
 Pook
 Tala
 Talaga 
 Tuy

Climate

Demographics

Economy

References

External links

 [ Philippine Standard Geographic Code]
 Philippine Census Information
 Local Governance Performance Management System

Municipalities of Laguna (province)